The Summerside Western Capitals are a Junior "A" hockey team based in Summerside, Prince Edward Island.  They are members of  the Maritime Junior A Hockey League, and they play their home games at the Consolidated Credit Union Place.  Until 2007 the team played at the former Cahill Stadium.

History
The Hemphill Pontiac Western Capitals began in the Island Junior Hockey League. Summerside is in the Western end of the province, & sometimes referred to as 'The Western Capital', thus the reference to 'western' in the  original team name. The Capitals joined the MJAHL in 1991. They hosted the Centennial Cup 1989 on behalf of the IJHL. This team was coached by former NHL coach, General Manager, & Team President of the Columbus Blue Jackets, Doug MacLean, a Summerside native.

The 1996-97 Western Capitals created a come from behind, story book tale during the year. They were coached by current NHL coach and former Detroit Red Wings player, Gerard Gallant, and they dominated the MJAHL Roger Meek Division during the regular season. In the first round of the playoffs they routed the Restigouche River Rats in five games. They beat out the Charlottetown Abbies in the second round before going on to win the Callaghan Cup by clinching a seven-game league final in Dartmouth. Following the tough playoffs came a long bus trip to Brockville, Ont for the 1997 Fred Page Cup. The winner of that tournament advanced to the Royal Bank Cup, which the Capitals were hosting that year. They lost all 3 games in the round robin and were eliminated. 

At the 1997 Royal Bank Cup in Summerside, the Western Capitals won the first game, 5-1n over the Rayside-Balfour Sabrecats. They then hit a stumbling block, losing their second and third games 7-5 and 8–2 to the Kanata Valley Lasers and the Weyburn Red Wings. They finished the round robin by losing 3–2 to the South Surrey Eagles in overtime. Because the Rayside-Balfour Sabrecats had already lost 4 games, the overtime loss game, the Capitals 3 points which was good enough for 4th place. After being shut out of the player awards, the Capitals had to come together as a team. In the regulation round, the Capitals did just that defeating the tournament's MVP and future NHLer, Mark Hartigan, and his Weyburn Red Wings 4–3 in a very exciting overtime. The Capitals used that win as a moral boost to defeat another Future NHLer, Scott Gomez, and his South Surrey Eagles by a very close score of 4–3. With that win the Summerside Western Capitals became the first team in Eastern Canada to win the national jr. A (Tier II) junior championship, Royal Bank Cup.

In 2001 the team made a run for the league championship. After sweeping the first two rounds without one of their top players, Denis White, the Antigonish Bulldogs took advantage of the Capitals beating them in five games to go on the Fred Page Cup. They did not make another significant run again until former Philadelphia Flyer, Forbes Kennedy, was hired as head coach in 2004–05. They were one of the leagues elite teams for the three years that he coached the team, going to the division final in 2005-06 but losing to the Woodstock Slammers in 7 games. In the 2006–07 season they won 15 games in a row to end the season  and went on to win the Meek division title before losing in 6 games in the league final against the Truro Bearcats. 

In the 2008–2009 season, the Capitals finished first place in the Meek division, and later went on to defeat the Dieppe Commandos, and Miramichi Timberwolves in 4 game sweeps to advance to the league championship series, to take on the Truro Bearcats for the second time in 3 years. This time though, the Capitals defeated Truro in 5 games, and won their first league championship since 1997, on home ice. The Capitals entered the Fred Page Cup tournament, and after going 2–1 in the round robin portion, they defeated the Pembroke Lumber Kings 4–1 in the semifinal to move to the final against the Dieppe Commandos. The Caps won the game 3–2 in double overtime after Mike MacIsaac scored, to send the Caps to their first Royal Bank Cup since winning it in 1997 as the host team. The Capitals travelled to the Pacific coast to Victoria, BC to participate in their 2nd tournament. Summerside had a 0–4 record heading into their final game against the defending RBC champions Humboldt Broncos. Summerside won the game 5–0, but were already eliminated from the tournament and finished 5th. The players were angry and upset about the outcome and engaged in roughing up one of the hotel employees at the team's hotel. Their behaviour resulted in the Capitals losing the right to host the 2011 Royal Bank Cup. Summerside got their chance to host the tournament in 2014.

The Capitals named Gordie Dwyer as their Head Coach and Associate General Manager for the 2009–2010 season. Dwyer led a rebuilding team to a regular-season record of 27-20-1-2 (won-lost-overtime losses-shootout losses). The Capitals finished third in the Roger Meek Division, and won a seven-game division semifinal series against second-place Miramichi. The Capitals were then eliminated by eventual league-champion Woodstock in a five-game division final. Dwyer returned for his second season in 2010-2011 as head coach and Associate Director of Hockey Operations. 

From 2001 to 2013, the Capitals were owned by a private ownership group consisting of local individuals.
In 2013, the Caps were sold to a new private local group.

Season-by-season record

Franchise records

These are franchise records held by previous team rosters. Figures are updated after each completed MHL regular season.

Notable alumni
Darren Langdon
Gerard Gallant
Darryl Boyce
Geoff Walker
Kent Paynter
Nathan McIver
Brett Gallant

See also
List of ice hockey teams in Prince Edward Island

External links
Capitals Website

Maritime Junior Hockey League teams
Ice hockey teams in Prince Edward Island
Sport in Summerside, Prince Edward Island
1970s establishments in Prince Edward Island
Sports clubs established in the 1970s